Ecuador competed at the 1984 Summer Olympics in Los Angeles, United States.

Results by event

Athletics
Men's 800 metres 
 Leopoldo Acosta
 Heat — 1:54.06 (→ did not advance)

Men's 5,000 metres 
 Luis Tipán
 Heat — 14:52.43 (→ did not advance)

Men's 10,000 metres
 Luis Tipán
 Heat — 30:07.49 (→ did not advance)

Men's Long Jump
 Fidel Solórzano
 Qualification — 6.93m (→ did not advance, 24th place)

Men's Decathlon 
 Fidel Solórzano
 Final Result — 6519 points (→ 23rd place)

Equestrian
 Brigitte Morillo

Judo
 Jimmy Arévalo

Shooting
 Ronald Dun
 Paúl Margraff
 Galo Miño
 Hugo Romero

Weightlifting
 Héctor Hurtado

Wrestling
 Iván Garcés

References
Ecuador Olympic Committee
Official Olympic Reports
sports-reference

Nations at the 1984 Summer Olympics
1984
Olymp